Peumerit-Quintin is a commune in the Côtes-d'Armor department of Brittany in northwestern France.

Population

Inhabitants of Peumerit-Quintin are called peumeritois in French, and puridiz in Breton.

Breton language
The municipality launched a Breton linguistic plan through Ya d'ar brezhoneg on 31 January 2005.

See also
Communes of the Côtes-d'Armor department
Listing of the works of the atelier of the Maître de Tronoën

References

External links

Communes of Côtes-d'Armor